Lepidiolamprologus elongatus is a species of cichlid endemic to Lake Tanganyika where it prefers rocky areas.  This species is a carnivorous predator on fish.  This species can reach a length of  TL.  It can also be found in the aquarium trade.

References

elongatus
Taxa named by George Albert Boulenger
Fish described in 1898
Taxonomy articles created by Polbot